Kryve Ozero is an urban-type settlement in Pervomaisk Raion in the northwest of Mykolaiv Oblast, Ukraine. It hosts the administration of Kryve Ozero settlement hromada, one of the hromadas of Ukraine. Population: 

The settlement is located on the banks of the Kodyma, a right tributary of the Southern Bug.

History
Kryve Ozero was founded in 1762.

In the 1920s, Kryve Ozero belonged to Odessa Governorate. In 1923, uyezds in Ukrainian Soviet Socialist Republic were abolished, and the governorates were divided into okruhas. In 1923, Kryve Ozero Raion with the administrative center in Kryve Ozero was established. It belonged to Pervomaisk Okruha. In 1925, the governorates were abolished, and okruhas were directly subordinated to Ukrainian SSR. In 1930, okruhas were abolished, and on 27 February 1932, Odessa Oblast was established, and Kryve Ozero was included into Odessa Oblast. In February 1954, Kryve Ozero Raion was transferred to Mykolaiv Oblast. In 1976, Kryve Ozero was granted urban-type settlement status.

On 18 July 2020, Kryve Ozero Raion was abolished as part of the administrative reform of Ukraine, which reduced the number of raions of Mykolaiv Oblast to four. The area of Kryve Ozero Raion was merged into Pervomaisk Raion.

Economy

Transportation
The closest railway station is in Liubashivka  to the south. It has connections to Pervomaisk and Podilsk.

Notable residents
Israel Wachser (1892-1919), Russian-Jewish writer of short stories and children's literature

References

Urban-type settlements in Pervomaisk Raion
Baltsky Uyezd